Fighting is the fifth studio album by Irish rock band Thin Lizzy, released in 1975. Following the release of four studio albums, the band finally forged an identifiable sound featuring the twin guitars of Scott Gorham and Brian Robertson. This sound draws from hard rock, folk, pop and rhythm and blues. It set the stage for the big commercial breakthrough of the follow-up album, Jailbreak. The album was also their first album to chart in the UK, hitting No. 60.

Songs
The track "Suicide" was originally performed by Thin Lizzy when guitarist Eric Bell was still in the band, including on a BBC broadcast recorded in July 1973. It was first performed with different lyrics under the title "Baby's Been Messing", and lacked the middle section that appears on Fighting. The non-album track "Half-Caste" was released on the B-Side of the original "Rosalie" single. Another track recorded at the Fighting sessions was "Try a Little Harder", which was eventually released on the Vagabonds, Kings, Warriors, Angels boxed set in 2002.

Fighting is the only other Thin Lizzy album aside from their 1971 debut where band members other than Phil Lynott receive sole songwriting credits for certain tracks. Bell wrote "Ray Gun" on the debut, and Robertson and Gorham wrote "Silver Dollar" and "Ballad of a Hard Man", respectively.

Europe guitarist John Norum covered "Wild One" on his 1987 debut solo album Total Control. Europe covered "Suicide" on their 2008 live album Almost Unplugged.

Although the distinctive Thin Lizzy logo (designed by Jim Fitzpatrick) was frequently used on compilation albums, merchandise and as stage scenery at the band's gigs over the years, this was the only Thin Lizzy studio album to feature it on the cover.

Reception

Stephen Thomas Erlewine of AllMusic described Fighting as a "tense, coiled, vicious rock & roll album", with which Thin Lizzy began their classic era. Highlighting Gorham and Robertson's twin-guitar interplay, he described this line-up as "vital and visceral", and added that Lynott had made a leap forward as a songwriter, "fully flourishing as a rock & roll poet". In his Collector's Guide to Heavy Metal Martin Popoff called Fighting a "soulful, stirring hard rock classic", where "Robertson and Gorham's fluid guitar harmonies become an integral part of the Lizzy sound, woven in the very fabric of the arrangements" and "the tales of outlaws and outcasts" reach "a fairly grandiose, history-encompassing, tragic scale."

"I was a Lizzy fan," recalled Sounds writer and future Kerrang! founder Geoff Barton, "but Fighting just didn't cut it for me at the time. 'The band's second LP with their new twin-guitar line-up is an adequate rock album, no more,' I wrote. 'This one suffers from the familiar Lizzy studio trait: lack of any real energy or aggression.' The following month I went to see Lizzy live… About halfway through the show, Phil went into a bit of a diatribe against rock critics and I wondered if he knew I was in the audience. It turned out he did! At the end of the monologue, Phil just kind of shrugged his shoulders and said, with a wry smile on his face, 'But, no matter what, this next song is for Geoff Barton: Still in Love with You.' That was probably the most humbling moment of my entire career."

Track listings

Remastered edition
A remastered 2-CD set deluxe edition of Fighting was released on 12 March 2012.

Singles
"Rosalie" / "Half Caste" – 27 June 1975
"Wild One" / "For Those Who Love to Live" – 17 October 1975
In the US and Canada, "Wild One" was released with "Freedom Song" as the B-side, and in Greece with "Rosalie" as the B-side.

Personnel
Thin Lizzy
Phil Lynott – bass guitar, vocals, acoustic guitar on "Wild One", producer
Scott Gorham – guitar
Brian Robertson – guitar, backing vocals, piano on "Song for Jesse"
Brian Downey – drums, percussion

Additional musicians
Roger Chapman (from Family) – backing vocals on "Rosalie"
Ian McLagan (from Faces) – piano on "Rosalie" and "Silver Dollar"

Production
Keith Harwood – engineer and mixing
Jeremy Gee – assistant engineer
Gilbert Kong – mastering

Charts

References

External links

Thin Lizzy albums
1975 albums
Vertigo Records albums
Mercury Records albums
Albums recorded at Olympic Sound Studios